Francis Boudreau-Audet (born November 8, 1993) is a Canadian pair skater, currently competing with Nadine Wang for Canada.  

He previously competed with Sumire Suto for Japan, and was the 2016 Toruń Cup champion and a two-time Japanese national champion.

Early career 
Boudreau-Audet began learning to skate in 2001.

Partnership with Koga 
His partnership with Japan's Ami Koga lasted two seasons. In December 2013, they were awarded the junior silver medal at the Japan Championships, having finished second to Sumire Suto / Konstantin Chizhikov. Making their international debut, they won silver in junior pairs at the Bavarian Open in February 2014.

Koga/Boudreau-Audet competed in the 2014–15 ISU Junior Grand Prix series, placing 4th in Tallinn and 6th in Zagreb. In March 2015, they finished 6th at the 2015 World Junior Championships in Tallinn. They were coached by Richard Gauthier, Bruno Marcotte, Cynthia Lemaire, and Sylvie Fullum in Montreal, Quebec, Canada.

Partnership with Suto

2015–16 season 
Boudreau-Audet teamed up with Japan's Sumire Suto in the spring of 2015. They decided to represent Japan in senior pairs, coached by Richard Gauthier and Bruno Marcotte in Montreal, Canada. Their international debut came in December 2015 at the Golden Spin of Zagreb, where they placed 7th. Later that month, they won the Japanese national title, ahead of Marin Ono / Wesley Killing and Miu Suzaki / Ryuichi Kihara.

In January 2016, Suto/Boudreau-Audet were awarded gold at the Toruń Cup. They went on the place 9th at the 2016 Four Continents in Taipei and 22nd at the 2016 World Championships in Boston

2016–17 season 
Suto/Boudreau-Audet began their season on the Challenger Series, placing fourth at the 2016 U.S. International Classic. They finished 7th at their Grand Prix assignment, the 2016 NHK Trophy. The two repeated as Japanese national champions, outscoring Suzaki/Kihari by 14 points for the title.

Programs

With Suto

With Koga

Competitive highlights 
GP: Grand Prix; CS: Challenger Series; JGP: Junior Grand Prix

With Wang

With Suto

With Koga

References

External links 
 
 

1993 births
Canadian male pair skaters
Living people
People from Saint-Jean-sur-Richelieu